The University of Maine School of Law (UMaine Law or Maine Law) is a public law school in Portland, Maine. It is accredited by the American Bar Association and is Maine's only law school. It is also part of the University of Maine System. The school's current dean is Leigh Saufley, who assumed the post in 2020. Until 1972 the School of Law was located at 68 High Street, Portland. In 1972, the School of Law moved to the University of Maine School of Law Building, which is adjacent to the University of Southern Maine's Portland campus. In 2023, the Law School moved to 300 Fore Street, on the waterfront of downtown Portland.

Many of Maine's judges, legal scholars, politicians, and community leaders are graduates of the law school. Notable alumni include Chief Justices of the Maine Supreme Judicial Court, Valerie Stanfill, Leigh Saufley, Daniel Wathen, and current governor Janet Mills, several former governors, former Maine Senate President Libby Mitchell, and U.S. District Court Judges John A. Woodcock and Lance E. Walker, to name just a few. According to Maine's official 2017 ABA-required disclosures, 62.7% of the Class of 2017 obtained full-time, long-term, Bar Passage Required/JD Advantage employment ten months after graduation.

Background
The University of Maine School of Law was established in 1962 and is a public institution. The campus is in an urban area in Portland. The Law School’s primary mission is to educate students to serve the public and private sectors with distinction; to contribute to the advancement of the law through scholarly and professional research and writing; and to engage in public services aimed at improving the legal system. Students have access to federal, state, county, city, and local agencies, courts, correctional facilities, law firms, and legal aid organizations in the Portland area. Portland is the major urban and legal center in the state. Facilities of special interest to law students are the Cumberland County Superior Court, the Maine Supreme Judicial Court, and the Federal District Court.

Academics
Students may take relevant courses in other programs and apply credit toward the J.D.; the maximum number of credits varies and must be approved. Maine Law offers two dual degree options with the Muskie School of Public Service at the University of Southern Maine: Juris Doctor and Master of Public Health (J.D./M.P.H.) and Juris Doctor and Master of Policy, Planning and Management (J.D/M.P.P.M). Students may also earn a dual J.D./Master of Business Administration (M.B.A.) degree, with the University of Maine School of Business. In addition, the Law School also offers LL.M. and J.S.D. programs.

Maine Law emphasizes hands-on training and offers an integrated clinical education program to  students, including civil practice and criminal defense under the auspices of the Cumberland Legal Aid Clinic. This clinic includes the General Practice Clinic, Prisoner Assistance Clinic (civil matters), Youth Justice Clinic, and the Refugee and Human Rights Clinic.

Students can also gain academic credit for work at many nonprofit and government agencies through an extensive externship program. Seminars in commercial law, consumer law, constitutional law, intellectual property law, and international law are open to second, third-year, and LL.M students.

Maine Law has emerged as a leader in the field of Information Privacy Law, and students can earn a Certificate in Information Privacy Law. The Law School’s Center for Law & Innovation hosts an annual Information Privacy Summer Institute, with a series of well-attended summer courses on critical and current information privacy issues.

In 2020, Maine Law began offering a Certificate in Environmental and Oceans Law. 

The Law School is also the home of the Center for Oceans and Coastal Law, a teaching and interdisciplinary research center devoted to law and policy of the oceans.

The Judge Frank M. Coffin Lecture on Law and Public Service is held annually, along with the Justice for Women Lecture Series and other lectures and similar events.  The Student Bar Association and other student organizations also offer guest lectures.

Maine Law has exchange programs with universities in several other countries, which enable students to experience a semester abroad, during which they gain an international perspective and develop a foundation in international law. The Law School currently offers international exchanges with Cergy-Pontoise University (France), City University of Hong Kong (China),  National University of Ireland (Galway), Reykjavik University School of Law (Iceland), Tsinghua University School of Law (Beijing, China), Universite du Maine (Le Mans, France), University of New Brunswick (Canada), and University of Rennes 1 (France).

Maine Law also offers a domestic exchange program with Howard University School of Law. A semester at Howard Law School gives students an opportunity to pursue specialized courses, such as further study in intellectual property law, while making connections with Maine Law alumni in the Washington D.C. area.

Publications
The school is home to the Maine Law Review and the Ocean and Coastal Law Journal.

Rankings, admission and employment statistics
During Spring 2018, U.S. News in its 2019 Best Graduate Schools publication ranked the University of Maine School of Law 106th on its list of Best Law Schools.

The Law School’s student body is small—one of the smallest in the country—with an average of 80-90 students per entering class. There were 604 applicants for the class of 2020, of whom 325 (53.8%) were admitted, approximately two-thirds of them coming from Maine. The median LSAT score was 153, and the average GPA was 3.42. Over half (53.6%) of the students in the entering class were women; 15.5% were members of a racial minority group.

According to statistics published by the Law School Admissions Council, Maine Law currently has a student/faculty ratio of roughly 12:1.

Maine Law's official ABA-required Employment Summary for 2017 Graduates shows that 62.7% of that class obtained full-time, long-term, Bar Passage Required/J.D. Advantage employment ten months after graduation. Maine Law's Law School Transparency under-employment score for the Class of 2017 is 26.5%, indicating the percentage of the Class of 2017 unemployed, pursuing an additional degree, or working in a non-professional, short-term, or part-time job nine months after graduation.

Costs
Tuition and fees Maine Law for the 2022-2023 academic year was $23,190 for residents and $34,710 for non-residents. The Law School Transparency estimated debt-financed cost of attendance for three years is $136,087 for residents and $175,673 for nonresidents.

Notable alumni

Administration

References

External links
Official webpage

Law schools in Maine
 
University of Maine System
1962 establishments in Maine
Educational institutions established in 1962
Universities and colleges in Portland, Maine